I Wayan Suweca (born in the 1950s in Kayumas, Denpasar, Bali, Indonesia) is a highly respected performer of Balinese gamelan. Since the 1970s, he has taught and performed extensively throughout Asia, Europe, and America. In the early 1980s, along with his students Michael Tenzer and Rachel Ann Cooper, he founded and led the famous Sekar Jaya gamelan ensemble in Berkeley, California. In 1993, he cofounded the ensemble Giri Kedaton in Montreal. From 1982 to 2004, he was professor at the National Arts Academy of Indonesia (STSI) in Bali. From 1987 to 1993, he was a guest teacher at Université de Montréal in Canada and in Rochester, USA. For other students, 

I Wayan Suweca has received many awards and commissions from foundations, galleries, and art organizations. In 1992, he was commissioned by Diffusion Système Minuit du Québec to create a "kreasi baru kontemporer" (contemporary music composition) for gamelan entitled "Cyclus Kahidupan" (The Cycle of Life). The work was created at galerie Articule and was simultaneously broadcast on CKUT radio in Montreal, Quebec, Canada. He directed the Gamelan de l'Université de Montréal's special concert for the anniversary of the Paris International Exhibition in 1989, which was broadcast on Radio-Canada and Radio-France. He is also a noted composer, kendang performer, and renowned gamelan gender wayang performer. He appears on more than thirty CDs for various labels, including Bali Records and Nonesuch. In 2006, he began working on a wayang kulit project and intensely researching traditional Balinese kekawin singing.

References and sources
Still and Moving Lines in the Family of Hyperbolas, Liner Notes, LP, Lovely, USA, 1986
AMERICAN WORKS FOR BALINESE GAMELAN ORCHESTRA, New World Records 80430, Liner Notes
Gamelan: Indonesian Arts in America" Special issue of Ear Magazine, volume 8 number 4, September/October/November 1983
Létourneau, André Éric, Retour de voyage en ces lieux oubliés de l'anéantissement, Galerie Articule, Montréal, 1992
Létourneau, André Éric, Actions radiophoniques in. Inter #55, Éditions interncention, Québec, 1993
Tenzer, Michael. Balinese Music. Tuttle Publishing; Subsequent edition (August 1998). . .
Bali Sangga Dwipantara interview, 2021 (Bahasa Indonesia)

Selected discography
 Gamelan Gender Wayang, Kayumas, CD, Bali Records
 STSI, Kreasi Baru, Bali Records
 Living Art, Sounding Spirit: The Bali Sessions, Rykodisc, USA, 1999

External links
 http://www.girikedaton.com
 http://www.gsj.org

Gamelan musicians
Balinese people
Indonesian Hindus
Living people
People from Denpasar
Year of birth missing (living people)